The Tecnam P-Volt is an Italian light electric aircraft under development by Tecnam in conjunction with Rolls-Royce.

Design and development
The P-Volt is being developed from the Tecnam P2012 Traveller as a nine passenger short-haul aircraft suitable for commuter airline use. Like the Traveller, it will have a high wing layout with fixed tricycle landing gear. Rolls-Royce is developing the electric power train and the aircraft is projected to have a range of 85 nautical miles per charge.
The range is projected with a 30 minute energy reserve for VFR, and the aircraft would be difficult to use with an IFR alternate.

Operators
Norwegian airline Widerøe has announced their intention to purchase an unknown number of P-Volt aircraft for delivery in 2025 and entry into service in 2026.

See also
 Eviation Alice

References

External links
 Press release: Tecnam P-Volt: Lifting The World To Sustainable Energy

Tecnam aircraft
Proposed aircraft of Italy